Lalanirina Rosa Rakotozafy (born 12 November 1977) is a Malagasy athlete who specializes in the 100 metres hurdles.

Her personal best time is 12.84 seconds, achieved in July 1999 in Niort. This is the current Malagasy record. She also holds the national 200 metres record with 23.09 seconds.

Competition record

References

External links

1977 births
Living people
Malagasy female hurdlers
Olympic athletes of Madagascar
Athletes (track and field) at the 2000 Summer Olympics
Athletes (track and field) at the 2004 Summer Olympics
World Athletics Championships athletes for Madagascar
African Games bronze medalists for Madagascar
African Games medalists in athletics (track and field)
Athletes (track and field) at the 1999 All-Africa Games
Athletes (track and field) at the 2011 All-Africa Games